The 2020 United States House of Representatives election in Guam was held on Tuesday, November 3, 2020, to elect the non-voting Delegate to the United States House of Representatives from Guam's at-large congressional district. The election coincided with the elections of other federal and state offices, including the larger 2020 United States House of Representatives elections and the 2020 Guamanian legislative election.

The non-voting delegate is elected for a two-year term. Incumbent freshman Delegate Rep. Michael San Nicolas, who was first elected in 2018, is seeking a second term. He was challenged by former U.S. Rep. Robert A. Underwood (Guam delegate from 1993 to 2003), a Democrat, and Republican Wil Castro. As no one got a majority of the vote, San Nicolas and Underwood faced off in a runoff within two weeks. The Guam Election Commission set the runoff election for Tuesday, November 17, 2020.

Primary
Because of the COVID-19 pandemic, Guam cancelled its August primary elections. All three certified candidates advanced to the U.S. House general election and appeared on the ballot in November 2020.

General election

Runoff

Official results from the Guam Election Commission

References

Guam
2020
House